Eunan Charles O'Kane (born 10 July 1990) is a professional footballer who most recently played as a midfielder for Leeds United.

Born in Northern Ireland, he represented the country at various youth international levels before switching to the Republic of Ireland at U21. He was named as a standby for Republic of Ireland national team's squad for Euro 2016 without being included in the final 23-man squad for the tournament.

Early life
O'Kane grew up in Feeny, County Londonderry, Northern Ireland, the eldest child of Charlie O'Kane and Lorraine O'Kane. He has one younger sister, Cora. O'Kane played gaelic football in his youth for Banagher GAC while his father helped to coach the Derry GAA hurling minors to their last Ulster title success in 2001. O'Kane went to primary school in St. Canice's and received second-level education in St. Patrick's College, Maghera. He joined Maiden City Soccer Academy at the age of 10 and was being scouted by Manchester City among other clubs from the age of 12. O'Kane decided to give up Gaelic football at the age of 16 to instead focus on his association football career.

Club career
O'Kane spent two years with Everton as a youth team player before joining Coleraine in September 2009. At Coleraine, O'Kane scored on his professional league debut in a 3–2 loss against Glenavon and in his 10th appearance, O'Kane scored a double in a 3–0 win over Glenavon.

Torquay United
O'Kane extended his contract with the club in December before spending time on trial with Torquay United at the turn of the year. It proved to be successful, and he subsequently signed a contract with the club until June 2010. He made his debut for the club in a 1–1 draw against Chesterfield and scored his first goal in a 3–1 win over Darlington on 6 March 2010. In his second half of the season at Torquay, O'Kane made a good impression, resulting in the club awarding O'Kane and Chris Robertson a two-year deal.

The following season, O'Kane continued to make an impression for the club as he scored six time and continued to set up goal 6 times this season against Crewe (scored again later on this season), Stockport County, Rotherham United, Hereford United and Northampton Town. O'Kane scored his first FA Cup goal in third round and the only goal in a 1–0 win over Carlisle United. Also in the season, Torquay reached 7th place, resulting to participate the Play-off to get promoted to League One. In the semi-final of the play-off, O'Kane scored the second goal in the goal with a 2–0 win over Shrewsbury Town which Torquay win in the second leg to progress to the final against Stevenage, who dominated against Accrington Stanley. But lost to Stevenage following the only goal in the game from John Mousinho, preventing Torquay to get promoted to League One and in the first half of the season, O'Kane signed a new contract extension, keeping him until 2014. Through the season, O'Kane continued to make an impression for the club as he scored 5 (against Macclesfield Town, Wimbledon, twice against Plymouth Argyle and Aldershot Town) and continued to set up goal 9 times.

Towards the end of the season, he was among 3 Torquay player (Bobby Olejnik, Kevin Nicholson and Lee Mansell) named in the PFA Team of the Year of League Two and it was the first time he received an honour. Once again, Torquay United reach 5th place, resulting to participate the play-offs and played their first game against Cheltenham Town but Torquay lost in both legs.

After the end of 2011–12 season, O'Kane was linked with Newly promoted League One side Swindon Town. Crawley Town was interested signing him after the club made an offer for him about £175,000 and the offer was accepted by the club. However, O'Kane rejected the move to Crawley Town after talks with negotiations had stalled. After a move to Bournemouth, O'Kane made an explanation rejecting Crawley Town, claiming the move wasn't for him.

Bournemouth
In mid-July, the club accepted a bid from an unknown club in the League One side, which later turns out to be Bournemouth. The move was officially made on 26 July 2012. O'Kane made his debut for the club in a 1–1 draw against Portsmouth on the opening game of the season. His first goal for the Cherries came in an FA Cup game against Carlisle United in a 3–1 win. Twenty-eight days later, Kane scored his first league goal, in a 3–0 win over Crawley Town. Then just a few days after scoring his first league goal, Kane scored again in an FA Cup game against Wigan, in a 1–1 draw, which results playing again.

In a 3–1 loss against Walsall on 19 January 2013, O'Kane penalised for handball after picking the ball up because he thought a free-kick had been awarded, which led to a penalty and ended the club's 15-game unbeaten run in League One. After the match, O'Kane made apology on his Twitter account, which Manager Eddie Howe has since forgiven him and commenting the incident, believing it's should not be a penalty; instead, a free-kick. Though the incident, Walsall's assistant manager Richard O'Kelly believes that O'Kane should be short-listed for the FIFA fair play award. O'Kelly would also go on to praise O'Kane for his honesty and sportsmanship. Later in the season, O'Kane would play an important role to help the club gain promotion to the Championship following a 3–1 win over Carlisle United on 20 April 2013, but finished second place following Doncaster Rovers' 1–0 victory over promotion-chasers Brentford.

On 11 March 2014, O'Kane signed a new three-and-a-half-year deal with the Cherries. He played 17 times in all competitions, scoring one goal during the 2014–15 season as Bournemouth won the Championship and earned promotion to the Premier League. During the 2015–16 season O'Kane made 17 appearances in all competitions for Bouremouth with 13 coming in the Premier League and he helped keep Bournemouth in the Premier League.

Leeds United
On 31 August 2016, transfer deadline day, whilst away on Republic of Ireland duty for a friendly against Oman, O'Kane signed for Championship side Leeds United for an undisclosed fee on a 2-year deal. He was given squad number 14 for the 2016–17 season.

O'Kane made his debut for the club in a 2–1 win against Blackburn Rovers on 13 September 2016. His impressive form upon arrival coincided with an upturn in Leeds' form with Leeds reaching 6th place by November 2016 and into the Championship Playoff positions and also the quarter-finals of the EFL Cup.

However, on 29 November 2016, O'Kane played only 28 minutes of a 2–0 defeat against Liverpool at Anfield after suffering a recurrence of a groin injury originally picked up on international duty with Republic of Ireland and had to be substituted for Kalvin Phillips. After several weeks out injured, he made his first appearance after recovering from injury in Leeds' 3–2 defeat against Barnsley F.C. on 21 January 2017. However he struggled to regain his regular starting first team place once returning from injury under Garry Monk.

After impressing during the 2017–18 pre season under new head coach Thomas Christiansen, on 11 August 2017 O'Kane was rewarded with a new 4-year contract at the club. He started the season as a regular alongside Kalvin Phillips, however after a good start to the season, both suffered a loss of form, O'Kane found himself in and out the side with Ronaldo Vieira given more opportunities and the arrival of January signing Adam Forshaw.

On 13 January 2018, O'Kane was given a straight red card after laying a headbutt on Ipswich Town opponent Jonas Knudsen, with O'Kane coming under heavy criticism for his form after the game. He returned from a three-match suspension on 10 February, when he was named as captain in new head coach Paul Heckingbottom's first game in charge of Leeds, in a 2–1 defeat against Sheffield United. However O'Kane inadvertently assisted Sheffield United striker Billy Sharp for both Sheffield goals, heading the ball directly to Sharp in Leeds' own box for the forward to score and subsequently fouling him for a penalty which he then converted from the spot.

With speculation that he was not in Marcelo Bielsa's plans, on 26 July 2018, O'Kane was not given a shirt number for Leeds for the upcoming 2018–19 season for Leeds. In August 2018, Charlton Athletic Manager Lee Bowyer revealed Charlton had made a loan bid for O'Kane, however O'Kane wanted to stay in the EFL Championship.

He was released by Leeds at the end of the 2020-21 season.

Luton Town
On 31 August 2018, O'Kane joined Luton Town on loan until January 2019 but the move was cut short after he broke his leg in the victory over Bristol Rovers on 15 September. Following surgery, O'Kane was set to return to Leeds United for rehabilitation, with the club announcing he would miss the remainder of the 2018–19 season.

O'Kane returned to Luton on an 18-month loan on 30 January 2020, but more than a year later he had yet to feature again due to further injury setbacks.

International career
After representing Northern Ireland at underage levels, O'Kane decided to switch allegiance to the Republic of Ireland in October 2011.

O'Kane received his first call-up to the Republic of Ireland squad in May 2012 for a European U21 Championship qualifier against Italy. He was called up to the Republic of Ireland senior national team squad in August 2015 for the first time with manager Martin O'Neill including him in a 37-man preliminary squad to face Gibraltar and Georgia in Euro 2016 qualifiers. He went on to make his first appearances for the senior team in March 2016 in a 1–0 as a substitute in the win over Switzerland, and then starting the following Tuesday in the match versus Slovakia.

After featuring four times during 2016 for Ireland and being named as a standby for Republic of Ireland for the Euro 2016, he missed out on selection for the final 23-man squad for the tournament.

On 31 August 2016, O'Kane returned to the Republic of Ireland squad in their first fixture since Euro 2016, for a friendly against Oman, where he was named as an unused substitute in a 4–0 victory in a match that turned out to be teammate Robbie Keane's final game for the national side. On 28 March 2017, he came on as a 63rd-minute substitute for Conor Hourihane in Ireland's 1–0 loss in a friendly against Iceland.

Style of play
A holding midfielder, O'Kane's performances have made him a favourite with fans and managers alike, especially Martin Ling who commented that O'Kane was 'a player like himself' who 'never shies away from wanting the ball, even after he's made a mistake.’

Personal life
After wanting to marry his fiancée Laura Lacole in a humanist ceremony, O'Kane was embroiled in a high-profile court case to have a humanist Wedding Ceremony recognised as a legal marriage ceremony.

On 20 June 2017, O'Kane and his fiancée Laura Lacole made history when they won their battle via the Court of Appeal in the Belfast High Court, Northern Ireland, the couple's ceremony on 22 June 2017 was the first legal humanist ceremony in Northern Ireland and the first in the United Kingdom outside Scotland.

Career statistics

Club

International

Honours
AFC Bournemouth
Football League Championship: 2014–15
Football League One runner-up: 2012–13

Individual
PFA Team of the Year: 2011–12 League Two

See also
 List of Republic of Ireland international footballers born outside the Republic of Ireland

References

External links
 
 
 
Northern Ireland profile at NIFG
Ireland profile at Soccerscene

Living people
1990 births
Banagher Gaelic footballers
Gaelic footballers who switched code
Sportspeople from Derry (city)
Association footballers from Northern Ireland
Association football midfielders
Northern Ireland youth international footballers
Northern Ireland under-21 international footballers
Republic of Ireland association footballers
Republic of Ireland under-21 international footballers
Republic of Ireland international footballers
Coleraine F.C. players
NIFL Premiership players
Torquay United F.C. players
AFC Bournemouth players
Leeds United F.C. players
Luton Town F.C. players
Premier League players
English Football League players
Atheists from Northern Ireland
British humanists
Republic of Ireland expatriate association footballers
Expatriate footballers in England